Death of a Ladies' Man is a 2020 Canadian-Irish coproduced comedy-drama film, directed by Matt Bissonnette. The film stars Gabriel Byrne as Samuel O'Shea, a college literature professor in Montreal who must confront his mortality and make peace with his family after a series of hallucinations lead to his diagnosis with an inoperable brain tumour.

The film's cast also includes Jessica Paré, Brian Gleeson, Antoine Olivier Pilon, Karelle Tremblay, Suzanne Clément, Joel Bissonnette, Pascale Bussières, Alexandre Nachi and Tyrone Benskin.

The film's themes are reflected through the use of seven Leonard Cohen songs in its musical soundtrack: "Bird on the Wire", "Memories", "Hallelujah", "Why Don't You Try", "Heart with No Companion", "The Lost Canadian (Un Canadien errant)" and "Did I Ever Love You". The use of Cohen's literary or musical work is a recurring motif in Bissonnette's work, also seen in his 2002 filmmaking debut Looking for Leonard and his 2009 film Passenger Side.

The film premiered on September 24, 2020 at the Calgary International Film Festival, and went into commercial release in Canada in theatres and on video on demand platforms on March 12, 2021.

References

External links

Death of a Ladies' Man at Library and Archives Canada

2020 films
2020 comedy-drama films
English-language Canadian films
Canadian comedy-drama films
English-language Irish films
Irish comedy-drama films
Leonard Cohen
Films set in Montreal
Films shot in Montreal
2020s English-language films
2020s French-language films
Films directed by Matt Bissonnette
2020s Canadian films
Irish-language films